Sir Henry de Raleigh (died 1301) was a knight from Devonshire, England, whose effigy in the form of a cross-legged crusader knight survives in Exeter Cathedral.

Origins
The place of his origin is unclear from surviving records, but he was probably a member of the prominent de Raleigh family seated at the manor of Raleigh in the parish of Pilton, near Barnstaple in  North Devon. In the 16th century the arms of Checquy a chief vair were recorded by the antiquarian John Leland as painted on the shield of his effigy in Exeter Cathedral. These arms were later adopted by the prominent Chichester family, the heirs of de Raleigh of Raleigh, Pilton.

Death and burial
He is known to have died whilst living at the Dominican Friary in Exeter, whence his body was forcibly removed by two Cathedral canons, including Walter de Stapledon (d.1326), later Bishop of Exeter, and given burial in the cathedral.

Monument in Exeter Cathedral

The Devon historian Sir William Pole (d.1635) wrote concerning Exeter Cathedral:
"Twoe knightes lye together in the wall wch devideth the quire & ye ambulatory, the on(e)  wth the armes of Bohun on his shield & ye other wth the armes of Ralegh of Ralegh: vid. Checque, or & geules a chief verry".

It is not certain which of the two contemporary effigies of cross-legged knights situated next to each other under separate niches set into the north wall of the south ambulatory of Exeter Cathedral represents Raleigh. Orme (2008) is one of the few commentators who has attempted to decide the matter, and he selected the westernmost (left-hand) effigy, under the arched canopy, as representing Raleigh, thus assigning de Bohun to the easternmost effigy, under the ogee-shaped canopy. The cross-legged and "lively" form of these effigies, of which several exist elsewhere in England, most notably in the Temple Church in the City of London, are generally supposed to represent crusaders, possibly members of the Knights Templar order.

Sources
Orme, Nicholas, "Whose Body?", published in "The Cathedral Cat, Stories from Exeter Cathedral", 2008, p. 25

Further reading
Little, A.G., & Easterling, R.C., The Franciscans and Dominicans of Exeter, published in Monograph no.3, History of Exeter Research Group, Exeter, 1927, pp. 40–5, 67-75

References

1301 deaths